Gammon Construction Limited is a Hong Kong construction and engineering contractor headquartered in Kwun Tong, Hong Kong. In addition to local construction projects, it also involved in construction and engineering various projects in China and Southeast Asia.

History
The company originated from a construction business founded in India by John C. Gammon in 1919. In 1955, a branch was engaged to build a new runway at Kai Tak Airport in Hong Kong. In 1958, Gammon Construction Limited ("Gammon") was formed to establish a permanent presence in Hong Kong.

Once incorporated in Hong Kong, it grew rapidly, obtaining construction work of a diverse nature.  By the late 1970s, it was established as the leading contractor in Hong Kong, participating in many of the major infrastructure projects of that time. The company began to expand business outside Hong Kong, establishing offices in Singapore and Vietnam.

Ownership
Jardine Matheson took a minority interest in Gammon in 1969 and it became a public company in 1970. Then in 1975, Jardines acquired the remaining shareholding and thus Gammon became a wholly owned subsidiary of Jardines. In late 1983 Jardine Matheson sold 50 percent of Gammon to Trafalgar House, a UK based company involved in construction, shipping and property.

In India, Gammon was taken over in 1991 by Abhijit Rajan. In Pakistan Gammon was taken over by the Bibojee Group. Gammon then became the preferred constructor throughout the Asia-Pacific region for both Jardines and Trafalgar House. In 1996, Kvaerner took over Trafalgar House thereby acquiring its 50% interest in Gammon. Skanska acquired all of Kvaerner's construction businesses, including Gammon, in late 2000. Balfour Beatty, the international engineering, construction and services group, subsequently purchased Skanska's 50% in Gammon in 2004.

Corporate affairs
It has its head office in Kwun Tong. It occupies  of space there. It moved there circa 2019.

Previously its head office was in TaiKoo Place in Quarry Bay.

Notable projects
Gammon has been involved in the construction of various major projects in Hong Kong and around the region:
 Bukit Panjang LRT line in Singapore completed in 1999 
 Chater House in Central, Hong Kong completed in 2002
 Tseung Kwan O line extension in Hong Kong completed in 2002
 One Peking Road in Kowloon, Hong Kong completed in 2003
 Le Méridien Cyberport in Southern District, Hong Kong completed in 2004
 Three Pacific Place in Admiralty, Hong Kong completed in 2004
 Maintenance depot on the Ma On Shan line in Hong Kong completed in 2004
 The Disneyland Resort line on the Tsing Chau Tsai Peninsula in Hong Kong completed in 2005
 The northern section of the Kong Sham Western Highway completed in 2007
 One Island East in Eastern District, Hong Kong completed in 2008
 Upgrading of the Woodsville Interchange in Singapore completed in 2008
 Nam Wan Tunnel in Hong Kong completed in 2009
 iSQUARE in Kowloon, Hong Kong completed in 2009
 Institute of Technical Education College West Campus in Singapore completed in 2010
 The Downtown section of the Chinatown MRT station in Singapore completed in 2013
 The Cathay Pacific Cargo Terminal at Hong Kong International Airport completed in 2015
 The Midfield Concourse at Hong Kong International Airport completed in 2016
 The northern section of the Hong Kong West Kowloon railway station completed in 2018
 The southern section of the Tuen Mun–Chek Lap Kok Link completed in 2018

The company is also involved in the construction of the Mayflower MRT station due to be completed in 2021 and Havelock MRT station due to be completed in 2022.

References

External links
 

Companies formerly listed on the Hong Kong Stock Exchange
Jardine Matheson Group
Construction and civil engineering companies of Hong Kong
Construction and civil engineering companies established in 1919
1919 establishments in Hong Kong